Mobirise is a freeware web design application that allows users to design and publish bootstrap websites without coding. Mobirise is essentially a drag and drop website builder, featuring various website themes. It is headquartered in Eindhoven, Netherlands.

History
On May 19, 2015 the first beta version 1.0 was released with the focus on no-coding web design and compliance to the Google mobile-friendly update. 

On September 30, 2015, version 2.0 was released, which added drop-down menus, contact forms, animations, support for 3rd-party themes and extensions. Since version 3.0, added some new themes and extension and introduced support for Bootstrap 4.

On June 16, 2017, version 4.0 was released, which presented the new core engine, new interface and new default website theme. 

In May 2018, there was released the updated 4.4 Android version of Mobirise.

On June 27, 2022, Mobirise developers released version 5.6.11 as their latest stable release.

References

External links
 
 Mobirise on GitHub

HTML editors
Web development software
Freeware
2015 software
Responsive web design
Web design
Mobile web
MacOS software
Windows software
Cross-platform software